Měcholupy may refer to places in the Czech Republic:

Měcholupy (Louny District), a market town in the Ústí nad Labem
Měcholupy (Plzeň-South District), a municipality and village in the Plzeň Region
Dolní Měcholupy, a municipal district in Prague
Horní Měcholupy, a municipal district in Prague